Coronel Martins is a municipality in the state of Santa Catarina in the South region of Brazil. It was created in 1992 out of the existing municipality of São Domingos.

See also
List of municipalities in Santa Catarina

References

Municipalities in Santa Catarina (state)